The men's individual pursuit C4 took place on 8 September 2016.

The event began with a qualifying race over 4000 m. Each of the athletes competed individually in a time-trial basis. The fastest two riders raced for the gold medal and the third- and fourth-fastest riders raced for the bronze.

Preliminaries
Q: Qualifier for Gold medal final
Qb: Qualifier for Bronze medal final
WR: World Record
PR: Paralympic Record

Finals

Men's individual pursuit C4